Events in the year 1962 in Bulgaria.

Incumbents 

 General Secretaries of the Bulgarian Communist Party: Todor Zhivkov
 Chairmen of the Council of Ministers: Anton Yugov (from 1956 until November 19) Todor Zhivkov (from November 19 until 1971)

Events 

 25 February – Parliamentary elections were held in Bulgaria.

Sports 

 September 15 – October 10 – The 15th Chess Olympiad took place between in Varna.

References 

 
1960s in Bulgaria
Years of the 20th century in Bulgaria
Bulgaria
Bulgaria